Wesley "Wes" Ramey (September 17, 1909 – March 10, 1997) was an American boxer who was dubbed the "Uncrowned Champion of the Lightweights". Although he was ranked as a top-10 lightweight contender for 10 consecutive years, he was never given a chance to fight for a world title. Over the course of his career he defeated Hall of Famers Tony Canzoneri, Benny Bass, Lew Jenkins and Cocoa Kid. He also faced the likes of Sammy Angott and  Pedro Montanez in defeat.

Although lacking in knockout power (he had only 11 knockouts in 152 wins), Ramey possessed excellent lateral movement skills; which allowed him to dart in and out of range. This, coupled with his excellent conditioning gave him a critical edge outpointing his opposition.

Reporter Bill Farnsworth, Jr. wrote, "Wes Ramey … came to Fort Hamilton last night and haunted Joey Costa, the New Jersey lad. Ramey was the ghost. He was so elusive for eight of the rounds that Joey couldn’t have struck him with a handful of buckshot." After retiring from the sport, Ramey ran two successful bars while concurrently training amateur and professional fighters. He was inducted into the International Boxing Hall of Fame in 2013.

Professional boxing record
All information in this section is derived from BoxRec, unless otherwise stated.

Official record

All newspaper decisions are officially regarded as “no decision” bouts and are not counted in the win/loss/draw column.

Unofficial record

Record with the inclusion of newspaper decisions in the win/loss/draw column.

References

External links

Cyber Boxing Zone Profile - Wesley Ramey

1909 births
1997 deaths
Boxers from Michigan
Lightweight boxers
International Boxing Hall of Fame inductees
American male boxers